Bartolomeo Colleoni was an Italian  light cruiser, that served in the Regia Marina during World War II. It was named after Bartolomeo Colleoni, an Italian military leader of the 15th century.

She was sunk at the Battle of Cape Spada early in the war.

History
Colleoni was launched on December 21, 1930. Bartolomeo Colleoni served in the Mediterranean until November 1938, when she sailed to relieve the cruiser  in the Far East. She arrived off Shanghai on 23 December 1938, and remained there until the outbreak of war between Britain and France and Germany. On 1 October, having turned over command in the Far East to the Lepanto, the cruiser returned home, where she arrived on 28 October.

Together with the cruiser , Colleoni formed the 2nd Cruiser Division in the 2nd Squadron. Her first operation was a minelaying sortie on 10 June 1940 in the Sicilian Channel, followed by troop convoy cover duties between Naples and Tripoli in July.

On 17 July the ship sailed from Tripoli, accompanied by Bande Nere, bound for Leros in the Aegean, where British activities in Greek waters were causing concern. In the early hours of 19 July, while off Cape Spada (Crete), the Italian squadron, having been reported by RAF aircraft the previous day, was intercepted by the Australian light cruiser  and five destroyers. During the ensuing engagement Colleoni was struck in the engine room by a shell from Sydney, which knocked out the boilers and immobilised her. She sank with the loss of 121 sailors.

Despite their speed advantage,  the Italian cruisers failed to outrun Sydney because the most obvious route of escape to the south was to be changed to south-southwest, in order to avoid being trapped between the enemy and the shores of Crete. This gave the Australian cruiser the chance to close the range, as she did. The light armour of Colleoni  was unable to defeat Sydneys rounds. The lack of aerial reconnaissance was another factor contributing to the Allies' successful chase.

Citations

References
 
 

The Cruiser Bartolomeo Colleoni Franco Gay and Valerio Gay (1988) 
Greene, Jack & Massignani, Alessandro (1998). The Naval War in the Mediterranean, 1940–1943. Chatam Publishing, London.

External links
 
 Bartolomeo Colleoni Marina Militare website 

 

Giussano-class cruisers
Ships built in Genoa
1930 ships
World War II cruisers of Italy
World War II shipwrecks in the Mediterranean Sea
Maritime incidents in July 1940
Ships built by Gio. Ansaldo & C.